The area codes in the state of North Carolina are as follows:

 252 - North Coastal Plain region in the northeast corner of the state, containing the Outer Banks (split from 919 in 1998)
 910 / 472 - South Coastal Plain region in the southeast corner of the state, including Wilmington (split from 919 in 1993; 472 created as overlay beginning on October 7, 2022)
 336 / 743 - Piedmont Triad and the northwest Piedmont region (336 created in 1997 as split from 910; 743 created as overlay in 2015)
 828 - Western & Mountainous region of the state (split from 704 in 1998)
 919 / 984 - The Research Triangle metropolitan region (919 created in 1954 as split from 704; 984 created as overlay in 2011)
 704 / 980 - Charlotte metropolitan area (704 created in 1947 as original area code for North Carolina; 980 created as overlay in 2001)

See also

References

 
North Carolina
Area codes